Ley Lines is the second full-length album by Sacramento metalcore band Embrace the End.  It was released on April 15, 2008, through Century Media Records. This is the first album by Embrace The End to only feature one vocalist.  In February 2009, a video was released for the track, "Denim on Denim Hate Crime". The name refers to ley lines, the paranormal concept of geographic lines of energy based on the placement of landmarks.

Track listing
"Cop in a Cage" - (3:32)
"Denim on Denim Hate Crime" - (2:06)
"Intensity in Ten Cities" - (4:08)
"Trainwreck on the John Galt Line" - (4:30)
"Ride It Like You Stole It" (featuring guest vocals by former vocalist Pat Piccolo of Embrace The End) - (3:33)
"Pity and the Road To Bimini" - (4:19)
"Overnighter" - (3:57)
"Sport The New Plague" - (1:00)
"Ley Lines" - (6:04)
"The God Stitch" - (4:38)

Credits
Jesse Alford – Vocals
Chris Topher – Guitar
Spencer Daly – Guitar, Vocals
Addison Quarles – Bass
Bart Mullis – Drums

2008 albums
Embrace the End albums